Jason Mark Muzzatti (born February 3, 1970) is a Canadian-Italian former professional ice hockey goaltender, and the current goaltending coach for the Carolina Hurricanes. He played 62 games in the National Hockey League between 1993 and 1998 for four teams. The rest of his career, which lasted from 1991 to 2007, was spent in various minor leagues and in Europe. Internationally Muzzatti played briefly for the Canadian national team in the early 1990s, and later in his career played for the Italian national team at several World Championships and the 2006 Winter Olympics.

Playing career
Muzzatti played four seasons at Michigan State University with a record of 83 wins, 34 losses, and 6 ties. He was drafted by the Calgary Flames in the 1988 NHL Entry Draft as the 21st pick in the first round. He joined the Salt Lake Golden Eagles of the IHL in 1991. He joined the Flames in 1993 but he had just a short career in Calgary, playing only two games in two seasons. He was claimed on waivers by the Hartford Whalers in 1995 and played 53 games before he was traded to the New York Rangers. He finished his NHL career in 1997–98 with the San Jose Sharks.

Muzzatti joined Deutsche Eishockey Liga side Eisbären Berlin in 1998. He joined Tappara, a Finnish SM-liiga team, one year later before returning to Germany and the Augsburger Panther for one season. In 2001, he moved to Italy to play for Serie A team HC Milano Vipers. Muzzatti became the number one goaltender for Milano. In 2004 Muzzatti was contracted by another Italian top team, Hockey Club Bolzano. Muzzatti was Bolzano's top goalie for two seasons.

In 2006, after 8 seasons in European top leagues, Muzzatti returned to North America and was contracted by Flint Generals of the United Hockey League. Muzzatti played the entire 2006–07 season in Flint Generals after which he retired. He was named the coach of the Generals in 2009.

International career 
Despite being born in Canada, and representing the Canadian national team during 1992–93, Muzzatti also holds Italian citizenship and played for the Italian national ice hockey team. He played in the 2006 Winter Olympics, held in Turin, Italy for the host country.

Coaching career
In 2008-09 Muzzatti started as an assistant coach with the Flint Generals of the International Hockey League (IHL). The following season in 2009-10 Muzzatti was hired as head coach of the Generals, and won the IHL Coach of the Year award that year.

Starting with the 2015–16 season, Muzzatti was the goaltending coach for the Michigan State Spartans for four seasons.

On August 13, 2019, Muzzatti was hired as the goaltending coach of the Carolina Hurricanes. He joined the coaching staff of Rod Brind'Amour, a former teammate with the Michigan State Spartan hockey team during the 1988–89 season.

Personal 
Muzzatti and former NCAA assistant coach Willie Mitchell co-founded Just Goalies, a training camp for young goaltenders. NHL goaltender Ryan Miller credits Muzzatti for aiding his development and considers him a friend.

Career statistics

Regular season and playoffs

International

Awards and honours

References

External links

Just Goalies Website

1970 births
Living people
Augsburger Panther players
Bolzano HC players
Calgary Flames draft picks
Calgary Flames players
Canadian ice hockey goaltenders
Carolina Hurricanes coaches
Eisbären Berlin players
Flint Generals players
Hartford Whalers players
Hartford Wolf Pack players
HC Milano players
Ice hockey players at the 2006 Winter Olympics
Indianapolis Ice players
Kentucky Thoroughblades players
Michigan State Spartans men's ice hockey players
National Hockey League first-round draft picks
New York Rangers players
Olympic ice hockey players of Italy
Saint John Flames players
Salt Lake Golden Eagles (IHL) players
San Jose Sharks players
Ice hockey people from Toronto
Springfield Falcons players
St. Michael's Buzzers players
Tappara players
Canadian expatriate ice hockey players in Italy
Canadian expatriate ice hockey players in Germany
Canadian expatriate ice hockey players in the United States
AHCA Division I men's ice hockey All-Americans
Canadian people of Italian descent